Kharkushi (also Romanized as Kharkūshī; also known as Gūshkī, Kargūshkī, Kar Gūshkī, Khargūshī, and Kharguskki) is a village in Byaban Rural District, Byaban District, Minab County, Hormozgan Province, Iran. At the 2006 census, its population was 773, in 138 families.

References 

Populated places in Minab County